Surangal is a village and panchayat in Ranga Reddy district, Telangana  India. It falls under Moinabad mandal.

Villages in Ranga Reddy district